The primary facility of the Tulsa Ports, known as the Tulsa Port of Catoosa, is near the city of Catoosa in Rogers County, just inside the municipal fenceline of Tulsa, Oklahoma, United States. Located at the head of navigation for the McClellan-Kerr Arkansas River Navigation System (MKARNS), it handles shipping loads through its waterway access to the Arkansas River via the Verdigris River. TPOC offers year-round, ice-free barge service with river flow levels controlled by the U.S. Army Corps of Engineers. The port ships manufactured goods and agricultural products from Oklahoma to the rest of the world. Designated a foreign trade zone, it is a major economic engine for the region with over 2.7 million tons of cargo shipped through the Port in 2013 alone.

History
The notion of making Tulsa a port city on the MKARNS evolved during the early 1960s, as the Corps of Engineers was constructing the massive waterway. A delegation of 23 Tulsa business people travelled to Ohio to evaluate the impact of the effects of the Ohio River Valley navigation systems on regional business growth. They concluded that it would stimulate business in Oklahoma, and convinced other Tulsa business leaders to support the concept. The Metropolitan Tulsa Chamber of Commerce appointed Early Cass to chair a committee, thereafter known as the City of Tulsa–Rogers County Port Authority.

The port received its first commercial shipment in January 1971,  It was officially  opened for business on February 20, 1970,  and was formally dedicated by President Richard M. Nixon on June 5, 1971. This port is the largest in Oklahoma. It is also one of the largest, most inland river-ports in the United States. It is a fully equipped multi-modal transportation center served by both the BNSF Railroad and the South Kansas and Oklahoma Railroad. The port also provides rail switching services, known as the Port of Catoosa Industrial Railroad (PCIR), utilizing three dedicated Port-owned switch engines. PCIR's operation was turned over to OmniTRAX in August 2022.

In 1971 (the first full year of operation), the port handled 86,654 tons of cargo. In 2013 (the most recently reported full year), it handled over 2.7 million tons.

In addition to the many private terminals for grain, fertilizer, and break-bulk cargo located along the port channel, the port operates a 200-ton capacity overhead crane as well as a roll-on/roll-off dock.

In 2016 the port added a new 720 foot dock accommodating a rail line and multiple cranes.

In 2020 the Tulsa Port of Catoosa received a $1.1 million grant from the U.S. Department of Commerce's Economic Development Administration for railroad crossing repairs, freight rail infrastructure, and interchange improvements at the multimodal shipping complex and industrial park.

On Thursday 24 September 2020, the Tulsa Port of Catoosa rebranded to Tulsa Ports.

Facilities
The port has five public terminals that can transfer inbound and outbound bulk freight between barges, trucks and railroad cars.
 Dry cargo terminals are owned by Tulsa Port of Catoosa. The dry break bulk cargo dock is operated by Tuloma Stevedoring, Inc. and primarily handles commodity iron and steel products. It also features a  overhead traveling bridge crane.
 Dry bulk freight terminal is a public terminal operated by Gavilon Fertilizer LLC, and which can handle materials ranging from pig iron to fertilizer. This terminal has two pedestal cranes and an outbound conveyor loading system. Both open and covered storage areas are available.
 Roll-on/Roll-off (RO - RO) low water wharf or "Project Cargo" is a public wharf operated by the Port Authority very large cargo (e.g. certain process equipment used in oil refineries. Often these cannot be shipped easily by truck or rail because of their weight or their overall dimensions. Sometimes these are shipped internationally by sea, and must be transferred to or from ocean-going vessels at the Port of Houston or the Port of New Orleans).
 Bulk liquids terminals handle such commodities as chemicals, asphalt, refined petroleum products and molasses. There are seven such terminals at the Port.

Tulsa Port of Inola
Tulsa Ports’ Inola facility, known as the Tulsa Port of Inola, is a 2,500 acre industrial park.  It has rail access to the Union Pacific, as well as barge access to MKARNS.  The first tenant, Sofidel, completed its manufacturing facility there in 2020.

In September 2022, Tulsa Ports received the largest grant in its history, being $22.3 million from the federal government, toward the $27.9 million cost of the Port of Inola Industrial Wastewater Treatment Plant.  The plant lays the foundation for industrial facilities which could likely provide 10,000 future jobs.

Change of leadership
Robert W. Portiss, who has been director of the Tulsa Port of Catoosa since July 1, 1984, retired on December 31, 2016. He was replaced by David Yarborough, who was hired as operations manager in 2006, and promoted to deputy director in 2008.

References

External links
 Tulsa Ports
 Oklahoma Digital Maps: Digital Collections of Oklahoma and Indian Territory

Ports and harbors of Oklahoma
Geography of Tulsa, Oklahoma
Economy of Tulsa, Oklahoma
Geography of Rogers County, Oklahoma
Buildings and structures in Rogers County, Oklahoma
Infrastructure in Oklahoma
Transport infrastructure completed in 1971